The Legislature of Neuquén Province is the unicameral legislative body of Neuquén Province, in Argentina. It convenes in the provincial capital, Neuquén.

It comprises 35 legislators, elected in a single multi-member district through proportional representation every four years. Elections employ the D'Hondt system and a 3% electoral threshold.

Its powers and responsibilities are established in the provincial constitution. The legislature is presided by the Vice Governor of Neuquén (presently Marcos Koopmann of the Neuquén People's Movement), who is elected alongside the governor.

The Legislature was established in 1958, when the National Territory of Neuquén became a province of Argentina. The first legislature convened on 1 May 1958. Since the establishment of the province, the regionalist Neuquén People's Movement (MPN) has dominated provincial politics and has been the largest party in the legislature.

References

External links
 
Constitution of Neuquén Province 

1958 establishments in Argentina
Politics of Argentina
Neuquén Province
Neuquén